Brighton State Recreation Area is an  recreation area, located near Mount Brighton ski area in Livingston County, Michigan.  It has 39 miles of trails for mountain biking, hiking, skiing and horse riding. There are 3 campgrounds providing over 200 campsites. It is also close to many other state parks, such as Pinckney State Recreation Area.

External links
Brighton Recreation Area Michigan Department of Natural Resources
Brighton State Recreation Area Michigan Trails

Protected areas of Livingston County, Michigan
State recreation areas of Michigan
Huron River (Michigan)